Thomas Henry Wilson (9 December 1902 – September 1992) was an English footballer who appeared in The Football League for Charlton Athletic, Wigan Borough, Cardiff City and Southend United.

References

1902 births
1992 deaths
Footballers from Lambeth
English footballers
Association football wing halves
Charlton Athletic F.C. players
English Football League players
Wigan Borough F.C. players
Cardiff City F.C. players
Southend United F.C. players